Duguwolowula is a commune in the Cercle of Banamba in the Koulikoro Region of south-western Mali. The principal town lies at Touba. As of 1998 the commune had a population of 26,374.

References

Communes of Koulikoro Region